Carter Creek is a stream in Carter and Reynolds counties of southern Missouri. It is a tributary of the Current River.

The stream flows southwest to south and passes under Missouri Route 21 and U.S. Route 60 before entering the Current about two miles southeast (downstream) of Van Buren.

Carter Creek was named after Zimri A. Carter, a pioneer settler.

See also
List of rivers of Missouri

References

Rivers of Carter County, Missouri
Rivers of Reynolds County, Missouri
Rivers of Missouri
Tributaries of the Current River (Ozarks)